Rafael Ángel Pérez Cordoba (3 July 1946 – 25 April 2019) was a Costa Rican long-distance runner. He competed in the marathon at the 1968 Summer Olympics.

References

1946 births
2019 deaths
Athletes (track and field) at the 1968 Summer Olympics
Athletes (track and field) at the 1972 Summer Olympics
Costa Rican male long-distance runners
Costa Rican male marathon runners
Olympic athletes of Costa Rica
Athletes (track and field) at the 1971 Pan American Games
Athletes (track and field) at the 1975 Pan American Games
Pan American Games competitors for Costa Rica
Competitors at the 1974 Central American and Caribbean Games
Central American and Caribbean Games silver medalists for Costa Rica
Sportspeople from San José, Costa Rica
Central American and Caribbean Games medalists in athletics
21st-century Costa Rican people
20th-century Costa Rican people